Smolensky is a rural locality (a settlement) in Khleborobny Selsoviet, Bystroistoksky District, Altai Krai, Russia. The population was 351 as of 2013. There are 4 streets.

Geography 
Smolensky is located on the Anuy River, 37 km southeast of Bystry Istok (the district's administrative centre) by road. Khleborobnoye is the nearest rural locality.

References 

Rural localities in Bystroistoksky District